US Highway 127 (US 127) is a part of the United States Numbered Highway System that runs from Chattanooga, Tennessee, to the Lower Peninsula of Michigan. US 127 is the primary route connecting Lansing and Central Michigan to Northern Michigan and the Mackinac Bridge. From the south side of Jackson northerly, it is mostly a four-lane freeway. A notable exception is a  stretch from north of St. Johns to just south of Ithaca, where the highway is built as an expressway and speed limits are lower. South of Jackson to the state line, the trunkline is a two-lane, undivided highway with access from adjacent properties.

The highway was first designated on November 11, 1926, along a series of existing state highways from Lansing southward toward Toledo. In 1930, the southern end was rerouted south of Somerset in rural northwestern Lenawee County to a course that ran directly south to the Ohio state line; the remainder was renumbered US 223. Starting in the 1950s, the highway was reconfigured to bypass Mason and other communities, converting US 127 into a freeway from Jackson to the Lansing area by the mid-1970s. When the Michigan Department of Transportation (MDOT) successfully petitioned the American Association of State Highway and Transportation Officials (AASHTO) in 1999 to remove US 27 from the state, US 127 was to be extended northward from Lansing to Grayling as the replacement designation. This change was made in 2002, resulting in the current configuration of the highway in Michigan. The United States Congress has designated an additional Interstate Highway, to be part of I-73, that would replace most or all of US 127 through Central and Southern Michigan, but any plans by MDOT to complete this highway were cancelled in 2001.

Route description
North of its junction with US 223 in Lenawee County, it is listed as a part of the National Highway System, a system of roads importance to the nation's economy, defense and mobility.
According to the department, 1,253 vehicles use US 127 on average near the state line, and 68,853 vehicles do so between M-43 and Kalamazoo Street in Lansing, the lowest and highest traffic counts along the highway in 2013, respectively.

State line to Lansing
US 127 enters Michigan as a two-lane highway south of Hudson called Meridian Road, which follows the course (with minor deviations) of the Michigan Meridian used to survey Michigan in the early 19th century. From the state line north, US 127 follows the Hillsdale–Lenawee county line north through agricultural areas in Southern Michigan. The highway intersects M-34 at Hudson. Near intersections with Manitou and Adams roads south of Addison, it crosses fully into Lenawee County. The highway continues due north from Addison to an intersection with US 223's northern terminus in the northwestern corner of the county, where US 127 turns northwesterly.

About a mile (1.6 km) farther north, US 127 intersects US 12 east of Somerset. US 127 continues northward, clipping through the corner of Hillsdale County and crossing into Jackson County. The highway follows Meridian Road through the southern area of the county until the interchange with M-50 southeast of Jackson. There US 127 transitions into a full freeway bypass to the east of Jackson while Business US 127 (Bus. US 127) follows M-50 into the city. The freeway crosses the Grand River twice near the South Street interchange. It also crosses a rail line of the Norfolk Southern Railway near the Page Avenue interchange. Northeast of Jackson, US 127 meets I-94 and turns westward to run concurrently with it along the northern edge of Jackson. US 127 crosses the Grand River again on this  section of I-94 before turning northward again.

The US 127 freeway continues northward, concurrent with M-50 for the first mile and a half (2.4 km) north of I-94. The freeway runs through rural northern Jackson County, paralleled by State Road before curving northwesterly near the county line with Ingham County. US 127 passes through Leslie with Churchill and Hull roads running parallel on either side of the freeway. US 127 loses these companion roads at  Mason where it curves northwest to the Lansing area.

On the southeastern side of the capital city, US 127 meets I-96. From this interchange northward, the freeway is also designated as part of I-496 (Ransom E. Olds Freeway). The I-496/US 127 freeway runs northward through suburban Delhi Township and into the city of Lansing. Right near the Red Cedar River, just west of the Michigan State University campus, I-496 and US 127 separate as US 127 continues north and I-496 turns west. This side of the city is mostly residential neighborhoods as US 127 runs along the East Lansing border, but there is a commercial area surrounding the Lake Lansing Road interchange before the highway crosses into Clinton County. US 127 meets I-69 northeast of Lansing, at the 1998–2002 terminus of the highway. From here north, US 127 follows the former US 27 north to Grayling.

Central Michigan
The freeway continues northward through rural Central Michigan farmlands. The freeway passes over the Looking Glass River near DeWitt. At Price Road, Bus. US 127 splits off to connect into St. Johns while the freeway bypasses the city to the east. US 127 intersects M-21 due east of downtown St. Johns before the freeway curves west and then north to intersect the northern end of the business loop. It is a four-lane divided highway with some local driveway access and cross traffic through at-grade intersections.

The expressway segment passes through an area that is mostly farms with occasional business. Just north of the Gratiot County line, the highway crosses the Maple River in the large wetlands area of Maple River State Game Area. North of the river, the expressway crosses a rail line at grade north of the one interchange along the expressway, connecting with M-57. South of Ithaca, the highway crosses the Bad River and transitions back to a freeway for the remainder of its routing. There are two interchanges on either end of Ithaca for that city's Bus. US 127 as the freeway runs east of that city's downtown area. US 127 runs due northward until curving northwesterly to pass between Alma and St. Louis. At the adjacent partial interchanges for Lincoln and State roads, two separate business loops depart from the freeway to run through the two cities. The Bus. US 127 for Alma follows Lincoln Road westward, while the one for St. Louis runs north on State Road. The freeway crosses the Pine River while running between Alma and St. Louis before intersecting M-46 and the northern ends of the two business loops at another pair of adjacent partial interchanges.

North of Alma, US 127 turns due north again and crosses into Isabella County. It runs near the campus of Central Michigan University, crossing the Chippewa River in Mount Pleasant. Mount Pleasant is also home to the Saginaw Band of Chippewa Indians and their tribal reservation. The area between the directional interchanges for Bus. US 127 in Mount Pleasant is marked by residential neighborhoods; the location of the M-20 interchange has some commercial properties, however. Otherwise, the landscape in Isabella County is mostly farms adjacent to the freeway.

The business loop for Clare splits from the main freeway south of the city, and it is also signed to provide access to eastbound US 10 via Bus. US 10, which US 127 crosses just south of the Clare County line. North of this line, US 10 and US 127 meet at a directional interchange. Traffic from westbound US 10 defaults onto northbound US 127, and traffic from the southbound freeway can exit onto eastbound US 10; no other direct connections are provided between the two freeways, requiring the use of the business loops through downtown to make the missing connections. The freeway rounds Lake Shamrock north of downtown and intersects the joint northern end of two business loops. There is a welcome center in the median of US 127/US 10 before the two highways separate north of the city.

US 127 continues northward through rural woodlands in Clare County to the community of Harrison. There is another Bus. US 127 for the community, part of which is also M-61. The freeway passes between Little Long and Sutherland lakes north of Harrison before intersecting the northern end of the business loop. US 127 serves the resort area at Houghton Lake in Roscommon County. It crosses the Muskegon River on the west side of Houghton Lake before running along the western side of Higgins Lake near the Crawford County line. Traffic along US 127 northbound has access to northbound I-75 and southbound traffic on I-75 can access US 127 southbound.

History

In 1919, the Michigan State Highway Department (MSHD) signposted the highway system for the first time, At the time, the original M-14 designation was assigned from the Ohio state line northward through Jackson, Lansing, Mount Pleasant, Clare, and Grayling. The highway also continued from Grayling northward through Gaylord to Cheboygan. Seven years later, the United States Numbered Highway System was created on November 11, 1926, and in Michigan's initial assignments, US 27 replaced M-14 between Lansing and Cheboygan, while US 127 ran from Lansing southward through Jackson to the Somerset area where it turned southeasterly, replacing the former M-80 and M-34 through Adrian to Toledo, Ohio. The remainder of M-14 south to the state line remained a shortened M-14.

The southern end of US 127 was rerouted in 1930 from Somerset south to Hudson and on to Cincinnati, Ohio. The section of former US 127 between Somerset and Toledo became US 223. The northern end was shifted slightly in 1950 in the city of Lansing when US 27 was rerouted from its car-only route to its truck route and US 127 was realigned to connect to the new routing.

The city of Mason was bypassed in 1954. The former route through town was designated Bus. US 127 at the time. The US 127 expressway was first started in 1957 with an extension south of Mason to Leslie. A further extension to Jackson was opened in 1958. By 1960, Jackson was bypassed to the east and the former route through downtown was redesignated Bus. US 127. Over the next few years, the expressway was upgraded to a full freeway that was completed in by 1964. The US 127 freeway was extended north to the Lansing area by 1968. Near Lansing, it was routed along I-496 to the north side of Lansing and East Lansing to connect with US 27. The last extension of US 127 for another 11 years was completed in 1973 when the freeway was completed north to the DeWitt area, connecting with US 27 there.

Two changes took place in the routing of US 127 in the 1980s as the I-69 freeway was completed. The northern Lansing bypass was completed in 1984, and I-69 was built through Clinton County in 1987. These changes routed I-69 along a portion of US 127 near DeWitt and removed a Temporary I-69 routing from US 127 on the east side of Lansing. The opening of the St. Johns Bypass on August 31, 1998, shortened US 127 by almost  while US 27 was routed along the I-69 freeway between exits 87 and 89 to connect with the new freeway northward. US 127 ended at its junction with I-69 and US 27 and no longer ran concurrently with I-69 afterward.

MDOT petitioned the American Association of State Highway and Transportation Officials (AASHTO) for approval to remove US 27 from Michigan in 1999. This proposed change was to remove the  concurrency of I-69 and US 27 southwest of the Lansing area. MDOT also proposed that US 127 be extended north over the former US 27 to Grayling. The highway markers were changed over in 2002, converting US 27 and the Bus. US 27 designations to US 127 and Bus. US 127, respectively.

In 2009, MDOT constructed Michigan lefts at several intersections in northern Clinton County to remove cross-street traffic.

Future
 As originally defined in 1991, the alignment of I-73 in Michigan would have run along I-75 to Detroit. However, the definition was amended in 1995 to include a branch along the US 223 corridor to south of Jackson and the US 127 corridor north to I-75 near Grayling. From Grayling northward, the I-73 corridor would follow I-75 to Sault Ste. Marie. Except south of Jackson, where it is a two-lane road and a section of road north of Lansing where the freeway reverts to a divided highway, this is mostly a rural four-lane freeway. While there are no immediate plans to convert the section between St. Johns and Ithaca to freeway, MDOT continues to purchase parcels for right-of-way to be used for future upgrades.

MDOT included using the US 127 and US 223 corridors as one of its three options to build I-73 in 2000. The others included using the US 127 corridor all the way into Ohio with a connection to the Ohio Turnpike or using US 127 south and a new freeway connection to US 223 at Adrian. MDOT abandoned further study of I-73 after June 12, 2001, diverting remaining funding to safety improvement projects along the corridor. The department stated there was a "lack of need" for sections of the proposed freeway, and the project website was closed down in 2002. According to press reports in 2011, a group advocating on behalf of the freeway is working to revive the I-73 project in Michigan. According to an MDOT spokesman, "to my knowledge, we're not taking that issue up again." The Lenawee County Road Commission is not interested in the freeway, and according to the president of the Adrian Area Chamber of Commerce, "there seems to be little chance of having an I-73 link between Toledo and Jackson built in the foreseeable future."

Exit list

See also

Notes

References

External links

US 127 at Michigan Highways

27-1
 Michigan
Freeways and expressways in Michigan
Transportation in Lenawee County, Michigan
Transportation in Hillsdale County, Michigan
Transportation in Jackson County, Michigan
Transportation in Ingham County, Michigan
Transportation in Clinton County, Michigan
Transportation in Gratiot County, Michigan
Transportation in Isabella County, Michigan
Transportation in Clare County, Michigan
Transportation in Roscommon County, Michigan
Transportation in Crawford County, Michigan